The 4th Hollywood Critics Association Film Awards, presented by the Hollywood Critics Association, took place on March 5, 2021, virtually. The ceremony was hosted by HCA Founder Scott Menzel.

The nominations were announced on February 1, 2021.

Winners and nominees
Winners are listed first and highlighted with boldface.

Special Honorary awards
 Breakthrough Performance by an Actor – Paul Raci for Sound of Metal Breakthrough Performance by an Actress – Cristin Milioti for Palm Springs''
 Standout Performance by an Actor or Actress 23 or Under – Sidney Flanigan for Never Rarely Sometimes Always
 Impact Award – Judas and the Black Messiah
 Valiant Award – Zack Snyder
 Inspire Award – Lin-Manuel Miranda
 Game Changer Award – Nicole Beharie
 Timeless Award – Dante Spinotti
 Spotlight Award – Kiera Allen
 Star on the Rise Award – Jo Ellen Pellman
 Artisan on the Rise Award – Emile Mosseri
 Trailblazer Award – Dwayne Johnson
 Acting Achievement Award – Aubrey Plaza
 Artisan Achievement Award – Trent Reznor and Atticus Ross
 Filmmaker on the Rise Award – Emerald Fennell
 Filmmaking Achievement Award – Steve McQueen

Films with multiple wins

Films with multiple nominations

References

External links
 

Film Awards 04
2020 film awards
2020 in American cinema
2021 awards in the United States